Corporal Hoi Kim Heng (1970 – 21 May 1994) was a police officer of the Singapore Police Force who was stabbed to death at the age of 24 by Soh Loo Ban after a chase near Fook Hai Building in Singapore on 21 May 1994. He was the second-last police officer to be murdered in the line of duty, the last being SI Boo Tiang Huat on 30 November 1994. The year 1994 was then considered a dark year for the police force.

The murder
Hoi, a regular police officer with the Central Police Division, was on regular patrol with his partner, Corporal Tan Huang Yee, in their Fast Response Car in the Chinatown area when they spotted Soh Loo Ban, 50, along Nankin Street. They stopped and stepped out to check on Soh, who was known for his history of crimes as a drug addict and mobster. When Corporal Tan asked Soh for his identity card, he pretended to reach for his card but instead had produced a  knife instead, which he used to stab Corporal Tan on his left arm before turning to flee.

Both officers chased after Soh down Nankin Street. When reaching the Fook Hai Building, Soh stopped, turned and dashed into the pursuing officers, colliding into Corporal Hoi and sending both men to the ground. As they collided, Soh stabbed Hoi in the left side of his neck with his knife, before continuing on his escape with Corporal Tan still in pursuit.
Corporal Hoi got up on his feet and briefly gave chase to Soh, but collapsed later on.

Soh was chased to the Hong Lim Food Centre where the slippery floor caused both Corporal Tan & Soh to fall. Corporal Tan sustained more stab wounds from Soh, but he fired shots at Soh with his revolver. Soh was shot in the chest and a stray bullet also struck a passerby.

Other officers arriving at the scene found Corporal Hoi barely alive and he was rushed to the hospital where he was pronounced dead an hour later. Soh did not survive. Both Corporal Tan and the passerby recovered from their injuries.

Aftermath
Corporal Hoi, who joined the Force in December 1989 was given a rare field promotion posthumously on 23 May 1994 to the rank of Sergeant, and was given a police ceremonial cremation with full police honours, and awarded the Pingat Keberanian Polis. Corporal Tan was also promoted to the rank of Sergeant.

The case made front-page news in the local media, and led to the public writing letters to the press expressing concerns over the possibility of police procedures preventing the officer from defending himself adequately. Existing police procedures forbade officers from drawing their weapons except when there were imminent signs of danger to themselves or others. Hoi's death contributed to a review of these procedures, which now permit officers to draw their weapons based on personal judgement and assessment of the situation presented before them.

References

External links
"Herbal Tonic", Khoo Kheng-Hor, Singapore Police Force, 2001

1970 births
1994 deaths
Male murder victims
Singaporean police officers
People murdered in Singapore
Singaporean people of Chinese descent
Murder in Singapore
Singaporean police officers killed in the line of duty